The Complete Short Prose 1929–1989 is a collection which includes all of Samuel Beckett's works written in prose, with the exception of his novels, novellas from Nohow On, and More Pricks Than Kicks which is considered "as much a novel as a collection of stories". The book was edited by S. E. Gontarski and published by Grove Press in 1995.

Contents
 Introduction by S. E. Gontarski
 Assumption (1929)
 Sedendo et Quiescendo (1932)
 Text (1932)
 A Case in a Thousand (1934)
 First Love (1946)
 Stories and Texts for Nothing:
 The Expelled (1946)
 The Calmative (1946)
 The End (1946)
 Texts for Nothing (1950-1952)
 From an Abandoned Work (1954-1955)
 The Image (1956)
 All Strange Away (1963-1964)
 Imagination Dead Imagine (1965)
 Enough (1965)
 Ping (1966)
 Lessness (1969)
 The Lost Ones (1966,1970)
 Fizzles (1973-1975)
 Fizzle 1 [He is barehead]
 Fizzle 2 [Horn came always]
 Fizzle 3 Afar a Bird
 Fizzle 4 [I gave up before birth]
 Fizzle 5 [Closed place]
 Fizzle 6 [Old earth]
 Fizzle 7 Still
 Fizzle 8 For to end yet again
 Heard in the Dark 1
 Heard in the Dark 2
 One Evening
 As the story was told (1973)
 The Cliff (1975)
 neither (1976)
 Stirrings Still (1988)
 Appendix I: Variations on a "Still" Point
 Sounds (1973)
 Still 3 (1973)
 Appendix II: Faux Départs (1965)
 Appendix III: Nonfiction
 The Capital of the Ruins (1946)
 Notes on the Texts
 Bibliography of Short Prose in English
 Illustrated Editions of Short Prose

Notes

Short story collections by Samuel Beckett
1995 short story collections
Grove Press books